Live is a live album by Australian soul and funk band Dynamic Hepnotics, released in December 1984. The album charted at number 66 on the Australian Kent Music Report.

Track listing

Charts

Personnel 
 Robert 'Continental' Susz – vocals, harp
 Andrew Silver – guitar, vocals
 Alan Britton – bass, vocals
 Robert Souter – drums
 Bruce Allen – saxophone, vocals
 Mike Gubb – keyboards
 Guest artist: Jason McDermid – trumpet

Production
 Producer – Mark Sydow, The Dynamic Hepnotics
 Recorded and mixed by Ross Cockle
 Photography by John Brash

References 

1984 live albums
1984 debut albums
Dynamic Hepnotics albums
Mushroom Records albums